= GCKey =

GCKey (French: CléGC) is a standards-based authentication service provided by the Government of Canada. It provides Canadians with secure access to online information and government services and assists Canadian federal government departments in managing and controlling access to their on-line programs through the provisioning of standardized registration and authentication processes. The GCKey Service issues a GCKey, which is a unique, anonymous credential that protects communications with online Government programs and services.

The GCKey Service is logically divided into two high level components:

1. The Credential Service is responsible for the registration and management of user credentials for individuals participating in the Government of Canada Federation for authentication to online services; and
2. The Authentication Service is responsible for the creation of Security Assertion Markup Language (SAML) assertions confirming to Service Providers (SPs) that a successful user authentication dialog has taken place.

The GCKey Service became operational starting in September, 2012 and is available to all Canadians.
